Liisa Savijarvi (born 29 December 1963 in Bracebridge, Ontario) is a Canadian former skier.

Career
Her career in Alpine skiing started with the Southern Ontario Division Ski team in December 1978. She made many appearances at the Canadian Alpine Championships and the FIS World Cup. She was part of Canada's team at the 1984 Winter Olympics in Sarajevo, attaining 9th place in the Giant Slalom and 18th place in the Downhill.

She achieved a number of podium places on the FIS World Cup schedule, including winning a Super-G in Furano, Japan.

Her career officially ended in 1988, following serious injuries sustained during a FIS World Cup training run on 17 March 1987 in Vail, Colorado. She was inducted into the Canadian Ski Hall of Fame in 1997.

References

External links
 
 
 Canadian Encyclopedia: Liisa Savijarvi

1963 births
Alpine skiers at the 1984 Winter Olympics
Canadian female alpine skiers
Living people
People from Bracebridge, Ontario
Sportspeople from Ontario
Olympic alpine skiers of Canada
Canadian people of Finnish descent